West Lake is an at-grade metro station in Atlanta, Georgia, serving the Blue Line of the Metropolitan Atlanta Rapid Transit Authority (MARTA) rail system.

It serves the area near Westview Cemetery and parts of West Atlanta. The station is located between West Lake & Anderson Avenues in West Atlanta. Bus service is provided at this station to the West End Mall, the Atlanta University Center  and Mozley Park.

Station layout

Bus routes
The station is served by the following MARTA bus routes:
 Route 58 -   West Lake Avenue / Hollywood Road
 Route 813 -  Atlanta Student Movement Boulevard
 Route 853 - Collier Heights
 Route 867 - Harlan Road / Peyton Forest / Dixie Hills

References

External links

MARTA Station Page
nycsubway.org Atlanta page
 entrance from Google Maps Street View

Blue Line (MARTA)
Metropolitan Atlanta Rapid Transit Authority stations
Railway stations in the United States opened in 1979
Railway stations in Atlanta
1979 establishments in Georgia (U.S. state)